NIKE J was the name for the Japanese version of the Nike-Hercules surface-to-air missile.  It was produced by Mitsubishi Heavy Industries.  First test firings of the missile occurred in November 1970.
The Nike J was also a different version of the usual Nike Hercules, in that way, that it could not be mated with a special (nuclear) warhead.
 Length: 12.5 m
 Diameter: 0.8 m
 Wing span: 2.1 m
 Weight: 4.5 tons
 Range: 130 km
 Speed: Mach 3
 Propulsion: Two stage solid fuel rocket
 Guidance: Radio command guidance

See also 
 MIM-14 Nike-Hercules
 Nike Javelin

External links
 http://ed-thelen.org/h_mono-5.html

Surface-to-air missiles of Japan
Project Nike
Japan–United States relations
Military equipment introduced in the 1970s